This article displays the rosters for the teams competing at the 2013 Men's EuroHockey Nations Championship. Each team had to submit 18 players.

Pool A

Belgium
Head Coach: Marc Lammers

Xavier Reckinger
Jeremy Gucassoff (GK)
Arthur Van Doren
Jérôme Dekeyser
John-John Dohmen
Florent van Aubel
Sébastien Dockier
Cédric Charlier
Emmanuel Stockbroeckx
Thomas Briels
Félix Denayer
Vincent Vanasch
Simon Gougnard
Alexandre De Saedeleer
Loïck Luypaert
Tom Boon
Jérôme Truyens
Elliot Van Strydonck

Czech Republic
Head Coach: Christopher Faust

Filip Neusser (GK)
Pavel Chrpa (GK)
Tomáš Jahoda
Martin Hanus
Tomáš Procházka
Štepan Bernátek
Ondrej Vudmaska
Reinhard Nicklas
Martin Babicky
Daniel Piterák (C)
Martin Lehovec
Jakub Kyndl
Tomáš Vohnicky
Tomáš Pauer
David Vacek
Martin Capouch
Richard Kotrc
Michal Krýsl

Germany
Head Coach: Markus Weise

Nicolas Jacobi (GK)
Linus Butt
Martin Häner
Mats Grambusch
Oskar Deecke
Christopher Wesley
Tobias Hauke
Jan-Philipp Rabente
Benjamin Weß
Pilt Arnold
Oliver Korn
Martin Zwicker
Moritz Fürste (C)
Marco Miltkau
Florian Fuchs
Benedikt Fürk
Thilo Stralkowski
Felix Reuß (GK)

Spain
Head Coach: Salvador Indurain

Francisco Cortés (GK)
Sergi Enrique
Bosco Pérez-Pla
Miguel Delas
Eduard Tubau
Roc Oliva
Ramón Alegre (C)
Gabriel Dabanch
Oriol Peremiquel
Xavi Lleonart
Andrés Mir
Marc Sallés
Salva Piera
Álex Casasayas
David Terraza
David Alegre
Mario Fernández (GK)
Pau Quemada

Pool B

England
Head Coach: Bobby Crutchley

George Pinner (GK)
James Bailey (GK)
Ben Arnold
Ollie Willars
Henry Weir
Simon Mantell
Harry Martin
Ally Brogdon
Michael Hoare
Adam Dixon
Barry Middleton (C)
Dan Shingles
David Condon
Tom Carson
Iain Lewers
<li value=26>Nicholas Catlin
Daniel Fox
<li value=29>Richard Smith

Ireland
Head Coach: Andrew Meredith

David Harte (GK)
<li value=3>John Jackson (C)
Jonathan Bell
<li value=6>Ronan Gormley
Michael Watt
Chris Cargo
<li value=12>Eugene Magee
Peter Caruth
<li value=15>Kirk Shimmins
Stephen Cole
<li value=18>Bruce McCandless
<li value=20>Michael Darling
<li value=23>David Fitzgerald (GK)
Kyle Good
<li value=27>Conor Harte
<li value=29>Peter Brown
<li value=30>Stuart Loughrey
<li value=32>Shane O'Donoghue

Netherlands
Head Coach: Paul van Ass

Jaap Stockmann (GK)
Pirmin Blaak (GK)
Klaas Vermeulen
Marcel Balkestein
Wouter Jolie
Billy Bakker
[[Valentin Verga]]
[[Jeroen Hertzberger]]
[[Robbert Kemperman]]
[[Sander Baart]]
<li value=16>[[Tim Jenniskens]]
<li value=20>[[Jelle Galema]]
<li value=22>[[Rogier Hofman]]
<li value=24>[[Robert van der Horst]] (C)
[[Seve van Ass]]
[[Goof van der Kamp]]
[[Constantijn Jonker]]
<li value=30>[[Mink van der Weerden]]
{{div col end}}

Poland
Head Coach: [[Karol Śnieżek]]

{{div col}}
[[Arkadiusz Matuszak]] (GK)
[[Pawel Bratkowski]]
<li value=4>[[Michal Raciniewski]]
[[Adam Chwalisz]]
[[Arkadiusz Rutkowski]]
[[Tomasz Górny]]
[[Dariusz Rachwalski]] (C)
<li value=10>[[Bartosz Zywiczka]]
[[Piotr Mazany]]
[[Maciej Pacanowski]] (GK)
[[Tomasz Wachowiak]]
<li value=17>[[Krystian Makowski]]
<li value=19>[[Tomasz Marcinkowski]]
[[Michal Nowakowski]]
<li value=22>[[Karol Majchrzak]]
[[Piotr Kozlowski]]
<li value=25>[[Adrian Krokosz]]
<li value=30>[[Mateusz Poltaszewski]]
{{div col end}}

References
{{Reflist}}

{{cite web|title=Belgium|url=http://www.trifinanceeurohockey2013.be/index.php?websitestructid=255|work=EHC2013|publisher=Trifinanceeurohockey2013.be|accessdate=18 August 2013}}
{{cite web|title=Czech Republic|url=http://www.trifinanceeurohockey2013.be/index.php?websitestructid=256|work=EHC2013|publisher=Trifinanceeurohockey2013.be|accessdate=18 August 2013}}
{{cite web|title=England|url=http://www.trifinanceeurohockey2013.be/index.php?websitestructid=257|work=EHC2013|publisher=Trifinanceeurohockey2013.be|accessdate=18 August 2013}}
{{cite web|title=Germany|url=http://www.trifinanceeurohockey2013.be/index.php?websitestructid=258|work=EHC2013|publisher=Trifinanceeurohockey2013.be|accessdate=18 August 2013}}
{{cite web|title=Ireland|url=http://www.trifinanceeurohockey2013.be/index.php?websitestructid=261|work=EHC2013|publisher=Trifinanceeurohockey2013.be|accessdate=18 August 2013}}
{{cite web|title=Netherlands|url=http://www.trifinanceeurohockey2013.be/index.php?websitestructid=260|work=EHC2013|publisher=Trifinanceeurohockey2013.be|accessdate=18 August 2013}}
{{cite web|title=Poland|url=http://www.trifinanceeurohockey2013.be/index.php?websitestructid=262|work=EHC2013|publisher=Trifinanceeurohockey2013.be|accessdate=18 August 2013}}
{{cite web|title=Spain|url=http://www.trifinanceeurohockey2013.be/index.php?websitestructid=259|work=EHC2013|publisher=Trifinanceeurohockey2013.be|accessdate=18 August 2013}}

{{EuroHockey Nations Cup}}

[[Category:EuroHockey Nations Championship squads]]
[[Category:2013 Men's EuroHockey Nations Championship|Squads]]